Nathaniel Dick Wallace (October 27, 1845 – July 16, 1894) was a U.S. Representative from Louisiana.

Born in Columbia, Tennessee, Wallace attended the common schools and graduated from Trinity College Dublin in 1865. He returned to the United States in 1867 and engaged in the commission business in New Orleans, Louisiana, in 1878. He was twice elected president of the New Orleans Produce Exchange and was active in manufacturing enterprises.

Wallace was elected as a Democrat to the Forty-ninth Congress to fill the vacancy caused by the death of Michael Hahn and served from December 9, 1886, to March 3, 1887. He was not a candidate for renomination in 1886 to the Fiftieth Congress. He served as president of Consumers Ice Co., New Orleans, from 1886 until his death on July 16, 1894 in Kenilworth, a neighborhood of Asheville, North Carolina. He was interred in Metairie Cemetery, New Orleans, Louisiana.

References

1845 births
1894 deaths
Democratic Party members of the United States House of Representatives from Louisiana
Alumni of Trinity College Dublin
19th-century American politicians
Burials at Metairie Cemetery